Harry Scott Newlands (9 February 1884 – 12 March 1933) was the British Chief Commissioner in the Gold Coast (British colony) from 1930 to 1933 and Governor of Barbados from 21 January to 12 March 1933. He died in office.

References

1884 births
1933 deaths
British people in British Barbados
British people in the British Gold Coast